Safwan bin Yahya al-Bajali is one of the companions of three Shia Imam, Muhammad al-Jawad, Ali al-Ridha and Musa al-Kadhim. Shaykh Tusi and Ahmad ibn Ali al-Najashi describe him as one of the most reliable and authentic narrators of Hadiths. It is said that Safwan would offer one hundred and fifty Rakat during night and fasted for three months every year.

His piety
It is said that one day a man asked him to carry two dinar for him and deliver them to his family in Kufa. Safwan said "My camels are
hired and I have to take the permission of the tenants." It is also said that he made a promise to two of his pious friends that if they died before him, he would do for them what they do for themselves of good deeds and charity, as long as he is alive and did so.

His jurisprudence
Safwan is known as one of famous jurisprudents of his time. He wrote about thirty books including the books of Wudu, Prayer, Fasting, the Hajj, Zakat, Marriage, Divorce, Obligations, Recommendations, Buying and Selling, Setting slaves free and Management, Good tidings and others. He dies in 210 AH in Medina and was buried in Al-Baqi'.

See also
 Muhammad al-Jawad
 Zakaria ibn Idris Ash'ari Qomi
 Ahmad ibn Ishaq Ash'ari Qomi

References

 

 
Shia hadith scholars
Burials at Jannat al-Baqī